Thomas Hartmann (born 26 March 1967) is a retired Swiss football striker.

References

1967 births
Living people
Swiss men's footballers
FC Lausanne-Sport players
FC Bulle players
BSC Young Boys players
Association football forwards
Swiss Super League players